El Molar is a municipality of the Community of Madrid, Spain.

Transport system 
El Molar has 8 intercity bus lines. 6 of them link the village with Madrid capital having the terminal in the Plaza de Castilla Interchange. These lines are:

Line 191: Madrid (Plaza de Castilla) - Buitrago del Lozoya

Line 193: Madrid (Plaza de Castilla) - Pedrezuela - El Vellón

Line 193A: El Molar - Cotos de Monterrey - Venturada

Line 194: Madrid (Plaza de Castilla) - Rascafría

Line 195: Madrid (Plaza de Castilla) - Braojos de la Sierra

Line 196: Madrid (Plaza de Castilla) - La Acebeda

Line 197D: Torrelaguna - El Vellón - El Molar

Notable people 
 Noelia de Mingo, physician known for having stabbed and killed three people (a co-worker and two patients) and injured seven others in Fundación Jiménez Díaz hospital in the middle of an outbreak of paranoid schizophrenia. Since 2017, de Mingo was residing in El Molar until September 20, 2021, when she was arrested for having again stabbed two employees of a local supermarket, fortunately without actually killing them this time.

References 

Municipalities in the Community of Madrid